Strangers / Lovers is the debut studio album by Norwegian singer Dagny, released on 2 October 2020.

Release
The album was divided into two halves. On 14 May 2020, Dagny announced that the first half, dubbed Side A, which included the first six tracks off the official album, would be released on 22 May 2020. The rest of the album was later released on 2 October 2020, along with Side A.

Critical reception
Upon its release, the album was critically acclaimed. Based on three reviews, at Album of the Year, the album received an aggregated score of 83 out of 100.

In a rave review for The Line of Best Fit, Dan Cromb called Dagny "a true force to be reckoned with" thanks to Strangers / Lovers. Additionally, he praised the album sonically, calling it "powerful, punchy, effervescent pop music at its finest."

Track listing
Credits adapted from Genius

Notes
  signifies a co-producer.

Charts

References

2020 debut albums